AMC Kabuki 8 is a movie theater in the Japan Center complex in San Francisco's Japantown neighborhood.

History
Kabuki Theater originally opened in 1960 as a large dinner theater.

The theater was the first multiplex in San Francisco. As part of the original Japan Center mission to showcase Japanese culture, it was the first authentic Kabuki theater in America, designed in a traditional 17th century style with a proscenium, stage entrance/exit ramp, revolving stage, and trap doors. The theater was designed with dining tables so audiences could eat while watching Kabuki performances. The restaurant, named the Kabuki Theater Restaurant, was limited to serving Chinese and American food so it would not draw business away from the Japan Center Japanese restaurants.

It has hosted San Francisco's Cherry Blossom Festival activities, is one of a small number of theaters showing performances by the San Francisco Opera, and has screened several films for San Francisco International Film Festival and San Francisco International Asian American Film Festival as recently as 2011.

Ownership
Formerly the AMC Kabuki Cinema 8, it was acquired by Robert Redford's Sundance Cinemas chain in 2006 as part of an anti-trust agreement allowing AMC to acquire Loews. Sundance renovated the theater, and reopened it under its current name in December 2007, as the chain's second theater. On October 6, 2015, it was announced that Carmike Cinemas has acquired Sundance Cinemas for $36 million. On November 15, 2016, Carmike was purchased by AMC Theatres for $1.2 Billion, bringing the theater back into AMC's control.

AMC announced on March 1, 2017, that the Carmike owned brands will be retired and all theaters would be placed under one of three new AMC brands. The Sundance Kabuki as of April 2017 was renamed the AMC Dine-in Kabuki 8. On April 4, 2018, the theater was re branded as the AMC Kabuki 8 and dropped the AMC Dine-in menu.

References

External links

Cinemas and movie theaters in California
Theatres in San Francisco
Theatres completed in 1960